Santiago González and Simon Stadler were the defending champions but decided not to participate.
Ryan Harrison and Travis Rettenmaier won the final 6–3, 6–3, against Rik de Voest and Bobby Reynolds.

Seeds

Draw

Draw

External links
 Doubles Draw
 Qualifying Draw

Calabasas Pro Tennis Championships - Doubles
Calabasas Pro Tennis Championships